Pseudotrichia is a genus of air-breathing land snails, terrestrial pulmonate gastropod mollusks in the family Hygromiidae, the hairy snails and their allies.

Snails of this genus are native to Europe.

Species in this genus of snail create and use love darts as part of their mating behavior.

Species
Species within the genus Pseudotrichia include:
 Pseudotrichia memnonis (Sturany, 1904)
 Pseudotrichia rubiginosa (Rossmässler, 1838)

References

 AnimalBase info at: 
 Species in the genus at: 

Hygromiidae